In mathematics and the foundations of quantum mechanics, the projective Hilbert space  of a complex Hilbert space  is the set of equivalence classes of non-zero vectors  in , for the relation  on  given by

 if and only if  for some non-zero complex number .

This is the usual construction of projectivization, applied to a complex Hilbert space.

Overview
The physical significance of the projective Hilbert space is that in quantum theory, the wave functions  and  represent the same physical state, for any . The unit norm constraint does not completely determine  within the ray, since  could be multiplied by any  with absolute value 1 (the U(1) action) and retain its normalization.

Rays that differ by such a  correspond to the same state (cf. quantum state (algebraic definition), given a C*-algebra of observables and a representation on ). No measurement can recover the phase of a ray; it is not observable. One says that  is a gauge group of the first kind.

If  is an irreducible representation of the algebra of observables then the rays induce pure states. Convex linear combinations of rays naturally give rise to density matrix which (still in case of an irreducible representation) correspond to mixed states.

The same construction can be applied also to real Hilbert spaces.

In the case  is finite-dimensional, that is, the set of projective rays may be treated just as any other projective space; it is a homogeneous space for a unitary group  or orthogonal group , in the complex and real cases respectively. For the finite-dimensional complex Hilbert space, one writes

so that, for example, the projectivization of two-dimensional complex Hilbert space (the space describing one qubit) is the complex projective line . This is known as the Bloch sphere. See Hopf fibration for details of the projectivization construction in this case.

Complex projective Hilbert space may be given a natural metric, the Fubini–Study metric, derived from the Hilbert space's norm.

Product
The Cartesian product of projective Hilbert spaces is not a projective space. In quantum theory, it describes how to make states of the composite system from states of its constituents. It is only an embedding, not a surjection; most of the tensor product space does not lie in its range and represents entangled states.

See also
 Projective space, for the concept in general
 Complex projective space
 Projective representation

References

Hilbert space